Dickson Nwakaeme Kabu (born 21 April 1986) is a Nigerian former professional footballer who plays as a forward.

Club career

Halmstad BK
Nwakaeme first professional debut is for Swedish first division Halmstad BK from 2008 to 2009. The "journeyman" forward played a huge role in destroying the defence and later on offered to a move to KuPS  the end of the 2008/2009 season.

KuPS
Nwakaeme played for the Finnish premier division team KuPS from 2009 to 2010. He made a big impact in his first match with KuPS, helping his team to a 3–0 victory over rivals RoPS Rovaniemi. He scored a goal and was voted player of the match at Magnum Areena. After KuPS Kuopio's defeat of FC Inter Turku, FC Inter manager Job Dragtsma claimed that Nwakaeme was the best striker he had ever seen in the Veikkausliiga.

Aalborg BK
Nwakaeme was loaned from Oulun Pallo to Aalborg BK from 1 September 2010 to 31 December 2010. He played seven matches and scored one goal.

SLNA
In April 2012, Nwakaeme signed a five-month contract with Vietnamese League champions SLNA. He scored on his debut for SLNA, coming off the bench in the second half to score a 93rd-minute equalizer against Sai Gon Xuan Thanh in the 14th round of matches in the Super League. The game ended 2–2 and preserved SLNA's unbeaten start to the league. Nwakaeme refused to extend his contract with SLNA.

Kelantan
In February 2013, Nwakaeme went on a trial with Malaysia Super League team Kelantan. After two weeks of trialling, he signed a one-year contract with the club. He made his debut playing against Maziya Sports & Recreation Club at Sultan Muhammad IV Stadium in Kota Bharu during the 2013 AFC Cup campaign. On 13 April, in the club's fourth match of the AFC Cup his lone goal led Kelantan to an AFC Cup win over SHB Đà Nẵng.

Pahang
In December 2013, Nwakaeme signed for Pahang together with Damion Stewart and Zeshan Rehman who had played for Fulham and Queens Park Rangers (QPR) respectively. On 8 March 2014, he scored his first score goal for Pahang FA after scoring twice against ATM FA and helping Pahang win the match. On 7 June 2014, he scored the winning goal against Felda United at the 2014 Malaysia FA Cup at Shah Alam Stadium. The goal brought the FA Cup to Kuantan after eight years of waiting. In 2014 Malaysia Cup, he scored two goals against JDT FC. The match brought the Malaysia Cup to Pahang, winning 5–3 on penalties after a draw in extra time.

Angers SCO
In 2016, he signed for Ligue 1 club Angers SCO, having been released by Pahang earlier in the year. His debut for his new club on 24 September that year was memorable, as a substitute, he scored an own goal in a 1–2 defeat to AS Monaco in the league. Nwakaeme scored his first goal for Angers in a Coupe de France match against US Granville in January 2017, scoring the winner in a 2–1 result.

Nwakaeme was released by Angers in June 2017 after only one season.

Return to Pahang

In January 2019, Nwakaeme rejoined Pahang FA. In the opening game of the 2019 Malaysia Super League, he scored twice in a 3–1 win over Kuala Lumpur FA.

Honours
Kelantan
FA Cup
 Winners (1): 2013
Malaysia Cup
 Runner-up (1): 2013

Pahang
Malaysia Cup
 Winners (1): 2014
FA Cup
 Winners (1): 2014
Malaysia Charity Shield
 Runner-up (1): 2015

Personal life
Dickson Nwakaeme is the older brother of Anthony Nwakaeme.

References

External links
 

Living people
1986 births
Nigerian footballers
Nigerian expatriate footballers
Expatriate footballers in Finland
Expatriate men's footballers in Denmark
Expatriate footballers in Vietnam
Expatriate footballers in Malaysia
Expatriate footballers in France
Association football forwards
Veikkausliiga players
Danish Superliga players
AaB Fodbold players
Kuopion Palloseura players
Kelantan FA players
Sri Pahang FC players
Angers SCO players
Ligue 1 players
Sportspeople from Lagos